The luang pho phet is a type of image of the Buddha found in Thailand. A luang pho phet depicts the Buddha in the Diamond Lotus Position.

Notable luang pho phet images

Notable luang pho phet Buddha images include the luang pho phet of Uttaradit (in Wat Tha Thanon), the luang pho phet of Phichit (in Wat Tha Luang), and the luang pho phet of Nakhon Thai (in Wat Na Phra That). The luang pho phet in Uttaradit is believed to have been constructed between 800 and 900 years ago.

luang pho phet in prayer

An English translation of a common Pali chant to be said before a luang pho phet image is as follows:
By body, by speech, and by mind, I will always revere the image named luang pho phet,
the Buddha statue, working wonders of psychic power. May I be blessed forevermore.

The text of the chant in Pali is as follows:
Kāyena vācāya va cetassa vā vajiraü nāma pañimaü iddhi-pāñihāriyakaraü buddha-rūpaü ahaü vandāmi sabbaso; sadā sotthī bhavantu me.

References

See also
Buddha images in Thailand

Buddhist art
Buddha statues in Thailand
Thai art